NGC 3402, also known as NGC 3411, is an elliptical galaxy in the constellation Hydra. The object was discovered on March 25, 1786 by German-British astronomer William Herschel. NGC 3402 is the largest galaxy in the eponymous NGC 3402 cluster.

See also 
 List of NGC objects

Notes

References 

Elliptical galaxies
3402
032479
Hydra (constellation)